Milan Suchopár (born 3 June 1952) is a Czech rower. He competed at the 1972 Summer Olympics, 1976 Summer Olympics and the 1980 Summer Olympics.

References

External links
 

1952 births
Living people
Czech male rowers
Olympic rowers of Czechoslovakia
Rowers at the 1972 Summer Olympics
Rowers at the 1976 Summer Olympics
Rowers at the 1980 Summer Olympics
People from Mělník
Sportspeople from the Central Bohemian Region